Parliamentary elections were held in Afghanistan in 1931. A new constitution, which came into effect on 31 October 1931, provided for parliamentary elections to be held every three years. The first of these were held in 1931. Suffrage was granted to men aged over 20. The first formal bi-cameral Afghan Parliament convened later that same year.

References

Elections in Afghanistan
Afghanistan
1931 in Afghanistan
National Assembly (Afghanistan)
Election and referendum articles with incomplete results